Angola is a city mentioned in the Book of Mormon. It was located near or in the north countries, and was the site of a portion of the long and final battle between the Nephites and the Lamanites.

The city is identified in only one verse, . The Nephites retreated towards the north countries, coming to Angola and fortifying the city during the period of AD 327–328, but were ultimately unable to withstand the Lamanites' attacks and were driven from the city.  might be interpreted in such a way as to suggest that Angola was located somewhere in the land of David.

It has been argued that Joseph Smith named the Book of Mormon city after Angola, New York. Mormon apologists have pointed out that while the Book of Mormon was first published in 1830, the New York settlement did not adopt the name "Angola" until 1855.

References

Book of Mormon places
Mormonism-related controversies